Primavera is a Venezuelan telenovela adapted by Vivel Nouel and produced by RCTV in 1987. It is based on an original story María Teresa written by Cuban writer Delia Fiallo. The series lasted for 221 episodes and was distributed internationally by Coral International.

Gigi Zanchetta and Fernando Carrillo starred as the protagonists. In 1999, Fernando reprised the same role on the Mexican version of the telenovela produced by Televisa.

Cast
Gigi Zanchetta as Andreína Méndez
Fernando Carrillo as Eduardo Luis de la Plaza
Carlota Sosa as Isabela Urbaneja de la Plaza
Sandra Juhasz as Graciela Méndez
Humberto García as Luis Alberto Urbaneja
Pedro Lander as Vladimir Vásquez (Doble V)
Alberto Marín as Rafael Méndez
Sebastian Falco as Angel Arismendi
Carlos Montilla as Salvador González
Yajaira Orta as Lourdes Falcón
Marielena Pereira as Valentina Vásquez
Vladimir Torres as Ernesto París
Romelia Agüero as Inmaculada González
Irina Rodríguez as Diana Méndez
Carmencita Padrón as Alcira
Zulay García as Yolanda Vivas
Verónica Doza as Agustina Mendoza
Dalila Colombo as Augusta Mijares

References

External links

Opening credits

1987 telenovelas
RCTV telenovelas
Venezuelan telenovelas
1987 Venezuelan television series debuts
1988 Venezuelan television series endings
Spanish-language telenovelas
Television shows set in Venezuela